Shitov is a Russian male surname, its feminine counterpart is Shitova. It may refer to
 Alexandr Shitov (1913–1989), Soviet intelligence agent
 Igor Shitov (born 1986), Belarusian football player 
 Vladimir Shitov (1951–2011), Soviet luger